Yagoda is a Russian surname meaning "berry". However, there is a change in stress and thus pronunciation—the surname is stressed Яго́да, and the word for "berry" is я́года. It also may be a Russian version of the name Yehuda (Judah).

Notable people with the surname include:

Genrikh Yagoda (1891–1938), Soviet state security official
Ben Yagoda (born 1954), American professor of journalism 
Myroslav Yagoda (1957–2018), Ukrainian artist

See also
Jagoda
Yagoda, Sri Lanka, town in Sri Lanka

Russian-language surnames
Jewish surnames